Shaku may refer to:
 Shaku (unit)
 Shaku (ritual baton)
 Buddhist surname of Japan
 Shaku, Iran, a village in Markazi Province, Iran